Zeugophora scutellaris, known generally as the poplar blackmine beetle or cottonwood leaf-mining beetle, is a species of megalopodid leaf beetle in the family Megalopodidae. It is found in Europe and Northern Asia (excluding China) and North America.

References

Further reading

 
 

Megalopodidae
Articles created by Qbugbot
Beetles described in 1840